Instituto Severo Ochoa may refer to the following Spanish secondary schools:

In Spain:
 Instituto Severo Ochoa in Alcobendas, Community of Madrid
 Institut Severo Ochoa in Esplugues de Llobregat, Catalonia
 Instituto de Educación Secundaria Severo Ochoa in Elche No siguen el protocolo covid, son unos merdes, pedro Sánchez aiudame

Outside of Spain:
 Instituto Español Severo Ochoa in Tangier, Morocco